The Services football team is an Indian football team representing the Indian Armed Forces in Indian state football competitions. It is operated by the Services Sports Control Board.

Santosh Trophy
Services have appeared in the final of the Santosh Trophy ten times, and have won it six times.

The team won their first Santosh Trophy in 1960–61 by beating Bengal 1–0 in the final. Since then, they have won the tournament another four times – 2012, 2013, 2015 and 2016. Their latest win came at the 2018–19 Santosh Trophy in Ludhiana, where they beat Punjab 1–0 in the final.

Honours

State
 Santosh Trophy
 Winners (6): 1960–61, 2011–12, 2012–13, 2014–15, 2015–16, 2018–19
 Runners-up (5): 1954–55, 1958–59, 1966–67, 1969–70, 2007–08
 Third place (1): 2022–23
National Games
 Bronze medal (1): 2022
 M. Dutta Ray Trophy
 Runners-up (1): 2002

Others
IFA Shield
Runners-up (1): 1950

See also
 Army Red
 Army Green
 Indian Air Force
 Indian Navy
 National Games of India
 Indian Army Service Corps

References

Santosh Trophy teams
Military association football clubs in India
Military sport in India
Organizations with year of establishment missing